Lea Bridge is an electoral ward of the London Borough of Waltham Forest, England. It also makes up part of the parliamentary constituency of Walthamstow and the North East constituency in the London Assembly.

It returns three councillors every four years to sit in the Borough Council. The councillors elected in the 2018 election were:
 Masood Ahmad (Labour)
 Mohammad Asghar (Labour)
 Yemi Osho (Labour)

Also see Lea Bridge for a general description of the area.

References

Wards of the London Borough of Waltham Forest